Oslavice is a municipality and village in Žďár nad Sázavou District in the Vysočina Region of the Czech Republic. It has about 700 inhabitants.

History

The first written mention of Oslavice is from 1320.

Oslavice was a sovereign municipality until 1 June 1980, when it was incorporated into Velké Meziříčí. Since 1 January 1992, it has been a separate municipality again.

Transport
Oslavice lies on a railroad of local importance.

Sights
There are two chapels, Chapel of Saint George and modern Chapel of Divine Mercy.

References

Villages in Žďár nad Sázavou District